The Salar de Uyuni mine is one of the largest lithium mines in Bolivia. The mine is located in southern Bolivia in Potosí Department. The Salar de Olaroz mine has reserves amounting to 3 billion tonnes of lithium ore grading 0.3% lithium thus resulting 9 million tonnes of lithium.

References 

Lithium mines in Bolivia
Mines in Potosí Department